The 1997–98 Club Atlético Boca Juniors season was the 68th consecutive Primera División season played by the senior squad.

Summary
The club reinforced the squad with several players: Claudio Caniggia  came back after a brief retirement, forward Martin Palermo   from Estudiantes La Plata, twins Guillermo Barros Schelotto, Gustavo Barros Schelotto   arrived from Gimnasia LP, Colombian centre back Jorge Bermúdez from Benfica, goalkeeper Oscar Cordoba   from America de Cali, defender Walter Samuel  from Newell's Old Boys, Mexican striker Luis Hernandez and Peruvian midfielder Nolberto Solano.

In Apertura Tournament the squad finished on 2nd spot just one single point below champions River Plate. On 25 October 1997 Diego Maradona announced his retirement being in fact, the last official match that he played.

For the Clausura Tournament, the club was reinforced with Rodolfo Cardoso, Sergio Castillo and Colombian midfielder Mauricio Serna. In spite of being heavily favourites the squad sank to the 6th spot prompting coach Veira to quit as head coach on 2 May 1998. Chairman Mauricio Macri wanted to appoint Daniel Passarella- then coach of Argentina National team- as new head manager, however, after a majority of Boca fans rejected him due to his past a River Plate idol, the club board did not sign a contract.

Meanwhile, former Velez Sarsfield head coach Carlos Bianchi rejected an offer from Julio Grondona Chairman of AFA to be the Argentina National team coach after the 1998 FIFA World Cup 
not accepting Jose Pekerman as manager and his high influence on Grondona. On 27 May 1998 Bianchi took the vacancy out at Boca appointed by Macri as new head coach of the club with a contract signed until December 1999.

Special uniforms 
Alternate kits worn only in 1997 Supercopa Libertadores

Squad 
Permanent squad numbers entered into force since 1997 Apertura:

Transfers

January

Competitions

Torneo Apertura

League table

Position by round

Matches

Torneo Clausura

League table

Position by round

Matches

Statistics

Players statistics

References

External links
 Club Atlético Boca Juniors official web site 

Boc
Club Atlético Boca Juniors seasons